Elements of a Proto-Uralic religion can be recovered from reconstructions of the Proto-Uralic language.

According to linguist Ante Aikio, although "evidence of immaterial culture is very limited" in the Proto-Uralic language, "a couple of lexical items can be seen as pointing to a shamanistic system of beliefs and practices." The concept of soul dualism, which is widely attested among Uralic-speaking peoples, probably dates back to the Proto-Uralic period: the word *wajŋi (‘breath-soul') designated the soul bound to the living body, which only left it at the moment of death, whereas *eśi (or *iśi, *ićći) referred to the 'shadow-soul', believed to be able to leave the body during lifetime, as when dreaming, in a state of unconsciousness or in a shaman's spirit journey.

The Indo-Iranian loanword *pi̮ŋka designated a 'psychedelic mushroom', perhaps the one used by the shaman to enter altered states of consciousness. The verb *kixi- meant both 'to court [of birds]' and 'to sing a shamanistic song', suggesting that it referred to states of both sexual and spiritual excitement. If the etymology remains uncertain, the word 'shaman' itself may be rendered as *nojta, and the shamanic practice as *jada-, although semantic variations in the daughter languages make the reconstruction debatable (cf. Erzya Mordvin jɑdɑ- 'to conjure, do magic, bewitch', East Khanty jɔːl- 'to tell fortunes, shamanize', Ket Selkup tjɑːrә- 'to curse; quarrel').

Several Finno-Ugric languages have a theonym that can be derived from the Proto-Finno-Ugric word *ilma meaning sky or weather. These include Udmurt Inmar, Komi-Zyrjan Jen, Khanty Num-Ilәm and Finnish Ilmarinen. These theonyms suggest an early central Proto-Finno-Ugric sky-god.

See also
 Finnic mythologies

References

Citations

Bibliography

Further reading 

 Hajdú, Péter (ed.). Uráli népek: Nyelvrokonaink kultúrája és hagyományai [Uralic peoples: Culture and traditions of our linguistic relatives]. Budapest: Corvina Kiadó. 1975. . (in Hungarian)
Jauhiainen, Marjatta. The Type and Motif Index of Finnish Belief Legends and Memorates: Revised and enlarged edition of Lauri Simonsuuri’s Typen- und Motivverzeichnis der finnischen mythischen Sagen (FFC No. 182). FF Communications 267. Helsinki: Academia Scientiarum Fennica, 1998.
Jones, Prudence; Pennick, Nigel (1995). A History of Pagan Europe. Routledge. pp. 178–183. .

Krupp E.C. (2000). "Sky Tales and Why We Tell Them". In: Selin H., Xiaochun S. (eds). Astronomy Across Cultures. Science Across Cultures: The History of Non-Western Science. Vol. 1. Springer, Dordrecht. pp. 20–21. https://doi.org/10.1007/978-94-011-4179-6_1

Leeming, David. From Olympus to Camelot: The World of European Mythology. New York, NY: Oxford University Press. 2003. pp. 134-138.

Siikala, Anna-Leena. "What Myths Tell about Past Finno-Ugric Modes of Thinking". In: Siikala, Anna-Leena (Ed.). Myths and Mentality: Studies in Folklore and Popular Thought. Studia Fennica Folkloristica 8. Helsinki: SKS, 2002. pp. 15–32.

 Valk, Ülo (2000). "Ex Ovo Omnia: Where Does the Balto-Finnic Cosmogony Originate? The Etiology of an Etiology". In: Oral Tradition 15: 145–158.
 Vértes, Edit (1990). Szibériai nyelvrokonaink hitvilága [The belief systems of our linguistic relatives in Siberia]. Budapest: Tankönyvkiadó. . (In Hungarian)

Uralic mythology